Dover sole refers to two species of flatfish:

 The common sole, Solea solea, found in European waters, the "Dover sole" of European cookery
 Microstomus pacificus, the Pacific Dover sole, found in the northeastern Pacific and called "Dover sole" along the Pacific coast of America